Yekaterina Mironova (sometimes listed as Ekaterina Mironova born 3 November 1977) is a Russian skeleton racer who competed from 2000 to 2007. She won a silver medal in the women's skeleton event at the 2003 FIBT World Championships in Nagano.

Mironova also finished tied for seventh (with Germany's Steffi Hanzlik) in the women's skeleton event at the 2002 Winter Olympics in Salt Lake City.

References
2002 women's skeleton results

Skeletonsport.com profile
Women's skeleton world championship medalists since 2000

1977 births
Living people
Olympic skeleton racers of Russia
Russian female skeleton racers
Skeleton racers at the 2002 Winter Olympics
20th-century Russian women
21st-century Russian women